1870 in sports describes the year's events in world sport.

American football
College championship
 College football national championship – Princeton Tigers
Events
 Columbia Lions joins the college football circuit and loses to Rutgers Scarlet Knights in its only game. Princeton Tigers beats Rutgers. Columbia doesn't play Princeton.

Association football
Scotland
 Formation of Stranraer FC
International
 5 March — the first international match between England and Scotland is a 0–0 draw at Kennington Oval but it is not officially recognised by FIFA as there is no Scottish FA in existence at the time

Baseball
National championship
 National Association of Base Ball Players champion – Chicago White Stockings
Events
 Openly there are fifteen professional teams in the field. Harvard college's strongest team tours during the summer and wins 6 of 16 against the pros.
 14 June — Atlantic of Brooklyn defeats the Cincinnati Red Stockings 8 to 7 in 11 innings, the first Red Stockings defeat since 3 October 1868.

Boxing
Events
 10 May — Jem Mace returns to competitive boxing and fights Tom Allen, nominally for the now-defunct English Championship at Kennerville, Louisiana.  Mace wins with a tenth-round knockout which confirms that he is still the best English fighter.  Claims are made on behalf of Mace that he is also the holder of the American Championship and this fight was the first world heavyweight championship bout.  Having not fought either Jimmy Elliott or Mike McCoole and strong anti-British sentiment within the mostly Irish-American boxing community at that time, these claims are still debated. 
 12 December — American Championship claimant Jimmy Elliott is arrested and convicted of highway robbery and assault with intent to kill.  He is sentenced to 16 years and 10 months at the Eastern Penitentiary in Philadelphia, eventually serving more than eight years.
 Elliott's rival Mike McCoole is inactive this year but, with Elliott out of contention, McCoole has the strongest claim to the American Championship with Mace now his main rival.

Cricket
Events
 2, 3 & 4 June — Gloucestershire County Cricket Club plays its initial first-class match v. Surrey at Durdham Downs, near Bristol.
 Formation of Derbyshire County Cricket Club
England
 Most runs – W. G. Grace 1,808 @ 54.78 (HS 215)
 Most wickets – James Southerton 210 @ 14.62 (BB 8–67)

Golf
Major tournaments
 British Open – Tom Morris junior

Horse racing
Events
 Inaugural running of the Irish Grand National at Fairyhouse Racecourse is won by Sir Robert Peel.
England
 Grand National – The Colonel (second consecutive win)
 1,000 Guineas Stakes – Hester 
 2,000 Guineas Stakes – Macgregor
 The Derby – Kingcraft
 The Oaks – Gamos
 St. Leger Stakes – Hawthornden
Australia 
 Melbourne Cup – Nimblefoot
Canada
 Queen's Plate – John Bell
Ireland 
 Irish Grand National – Sir Robert Peel
 Irish Derby Stakes – Billy Pitt
USA
 Belmont Stakes – Kingfisher

Rowing
The Boat Race
 6 April — Cambridge wins the 27th Oxford and Cambridge Boat Race
Other events
 In Australia, the inaugural Australian Universities Boat Race is won by Melbourne in 31 mins 4 seconds

Rugby football
Events
 Foundation of Leeds RLFC
 Alcock's Football Annual lists approximately 75 clubs playing Rugby School football rules.  These clubs have different interpretations of the laws as played at Rugby School.
 The Nelson club of New Zealand starts to play Rugby School rules, the first club in that country to do so.
 May 14 - The first game of rugby in New Zealand is played in Nelson between Nelson College and the Nelson Rugby Football Club.
 In November, an anonymous surgeon writes to The Times complaining that Rugby football is dangerous.  The letter fuels agreement in the sport to form a ruling body which will regulate the laws.

Yacht racing

America's Cup
 8 August — the New York Yacht Club wins the first America's Cup challenge race, as Magic defeats British challenger Cambria'', of the Royal Thames Yacht Club.

References

 
Sports by year